B85 may refer to :
 Bundesstraße 85, a German road
 Rosental Straße, an Austrian road
 Sicilian Defence, Scheveningen Variation, according to the list of chess openings